Fred Jones  (11 January 1938 – 22 March 2013) was a Welsh professional footballer who played as an outside left in the 1950s and early 1960s, and won two caps for his country's under-23 side. After developing in the youth team at Hereford United, he left to join Arsenal in January 1958. He made no first-team competitive appearances for the London club in his nine months there, although he did play in a friendly against Eintracht Frankfurt in February 1958.

In September 1958 he moved on to Brighton & Hove Albion. Spells at Swindon Town and Grimsby Town followed and he finished his League career at Reading.

References

1938 births
2013 deaths
People from Gelligaer
Sportspeople from Caerphilly County Borough
Welsh footballers
Hereford United F.C. players
Arsenal F.C. players
Brighton & Hove Albion F.C. players
Swindon Town F.C. players
Grimsby Town F.C. players
Reading F.C. players
Cheltenham Town F.C. players
Wales under-23 international footballers
Association football outside forwards
Stafford Rangers F.C. players
Pontllanfraith A.F.C. players